Hemitaeniochromis brachyrhynchus is a species of fish in the family Cichlidae. Its specific epithet brachyrhynchus (meaning: short snout) refers to the most distinctive characteristic of this species, the reduced length of the head in front of the eye (Oliver 2012: 42). Prior to the formal description of this species in 2012, the specimen which became the paratype was provisionally called Hemitaeniochromis sp. 'insignis big eye' (Snoeks & Hanssens 2004: 284 & fig. 52); however, the species has no accepted common name.

This species is suspected of being paedophagous, because it shares attributes of its dentition, a heavy dentary or lower jaw, and thickened oral mucous membrane in which the teeth are buried, all characteristics found especially in other known paedophagous cichlids (Oliver 2012: 45). However, this diet has not been confirmed since neither behavioral observation nor analysis of its stomach contents has been possible.

It has been found only at two widely separated localities in Malawi, Thumbi Island West at Cape Maclear and Nkhata Bay. It occurs in the deeper, rocky habitats of Lake Malawi, and is unknown in the aquarium trade.

References

 Oliver, M.K. (2012). Hemitaeniochromis brachyrhynchus, a new species of cichlid fish from Lake Malaŵi, with comments on some other supposed members of the genus (Teleostei: Cichlidae). Zootaxa, 3410: 35–50. PDF
 Snoeks, J. & Hanssens, M. (2004). Identification guidelines to other non-mbuna. In: Snoeks, J. (Ed.), The cichlid diversity of Lake Malawi/Nyasa/Niassa: identification, distribution and taxonomy. Cichlid Press, El Paso, Texas, pp. 266–310.

Fish described in 2012
Taxa named by Michael K. Oliver
brachyrhynchus